KQIQ (88.3 FM) is a Christian radio station licensed to Beatrice, Nebraska, United States. The station is owned by My Bridge Radio.

References

External links

QIQ